Alice Nayo (born January 16, 1993 in Gonesse, France) is a French basketball player who plays for club ESB Villeneuve-d'Ascq of the League feminine de basket the top league of basketball for women in France.

References

French women's basketball players
1993 births
Living people
People from Gonesse